Olaf II of Denmark (December 1370 – 3 August 1387) was King of Denmark as Olaf II (though occasionally referred to as Olaf III) from 1376 and King of Norway as Olaf IV from 1380 until his death. Olaf was the son of Queen Margaret I of Denmark and King Haakon VI of Norway, and grandson of kings Magnus IV of Sweden and Valdemar IV of Denmark.

Reign
When his grandfather Valdemar IV of Denmark died, Olaf was just five years old. He was proclaimed king of Denmark by a Danehof in Slagelse the following year. His mother, Queen Margaret, was to serve as regent due to his young age.  His proclamation included the title "true heir of Sweden" added at his mother's insistence since his paternal grandfather, Magnus IV, had been king of Sweden until forced to abdicate. Olaf was hailed as king in Scania, including the towns controlled by the Hanseatic league since the Treaty of Stralsund in 1370. Queen Margaret signed a coronation charter on behalf of Olaf, who was too young to rule until he came of age at fifteen. In the charter Olaf agreed to meet with the Danehof at least once a year and return properties his grandfather Valdemar IV had confiscated during his reign.

Olaf became king of Norway on his father's death in 1380. Even when Olaf reached his majority in 1385, his mother ruled through him. With his ascent to the Norwegian throne, Denmark and Norway were thus united in a personal union ruled from Denmark. Denmark and Norway would have the same king, with the exception of short interregnums, until Norway's independence from Denmark in 1814, as a result of the Treaty of Kiel.

Death and aftermath
Olaf died unexpectedly at Falsterbohus in August 1387 at age 16. He was buried at Sorø Abbey on the Danish island of Zealand where his grandfather and, later, his mother, were also buried. Rumors immediately arose that Olaf had been poisoned. Following her son's death, Margaret united all three Scandinavian kingdoms in a personal union. After Olaf, no Norwegian king was to be born on Norwegian soil for more than 550 years, until Harald V, born in 1937, became king in 1991. Olaf's death was also the end of the male line of the House of Bjelbo in Sweden.

In 1402 he was impersonated by the False Olaf.

References

Other sources

Albrectsen, Esben Danmark-Norge 1380–1814. B. 1 Fællesskabet bliver til : 1380–1536  (Danske historiske forening. 1981)

1370 births
1387 deaths
14th-century monarchs of Denmark
14th-century Norwegian monarchs
House of Bjelbo
Medieval child monarchs
Oluf 02
Sons of kings